RareConnect is a platform where patients and families share their experiences and knowledge about living with a rare disease.

Mission 
To empower the rare disease community by bringing people together to share experiences and support one another.

History 
The creation of RareConnect came from EURORDIS (European Rare Disease Organization) and NORD (National Organization for Rare Disorder) on January 1, 2019 with the idea of providing a safe space for individuals and families affected by rare diseases to interact with one another.

About 
RareConnect is a non-profit organization platform. It offers a safe-patient-hosted online community for both patients and caregivers who are affected by rare diseases. Allows people with a rare disease to communicate freely and safely with each other. To maintain a patient-led community RareConnect partners with other patient organizations across the world to offer a global online community. RareConnect has over 45,000 members with over 180 disease specific communities. There is also a community for people without a diagnosis. The communities on RareConnect are maintained and moderated by an individual who has a similar rare disease and are also associated with a patient group. Through this interaction individuals share resources, tips, advice and personal experiences in order to help each other.

Translations are available for participants and members allowing for a wide range of understanding. Translations include English, French, German, Italian, Portuguese, Spanish, Russian, Serbo-Croatian, Czech, Ukrainian and Japanese.

The platform is split into three sections. What, Meet, and Learn. The "what" section hosts blogs, patients and caregivers stories and experiences. The "meet" section are where the forums are housed while the "learn" section is home to the FAQs, news articles, upcoming events, and contact information.

Everything posted on RareConnect is universally translated by Google Translate. This plays a big role in countries were information about rare diseases is scarce. RareConnect breaks these language barriers down in order to create a global community of those with rare diseases.

Scope 
Allow members to find guidance and support through a community of people who share the similar diseases. Promote an engaging and supportive community while allowing members to advocate for organizations. Create a safe and supportive environment for members while promoting the discovery of research studies that members find beneficial.

Operating Partners 
EURORDIS Rare Diseases Europe
NORBS National Organisation For Rare Disease of Serbia
Rare Disease Foundation of Iran

References 

Medical websites
Advice columns
Social networking websites

External Links 
RareConnect